Robert Messingham (died 1396), of Lincoln, was an English politician.

He was elected Mayor of Lincoln for 1388–89 and a Member (MP) of the Parliament of England for Lincoln in 1394.

References

Year of birth missing
1396 deaths
English MPs 1394
Members of the Parliament of England (pre-1707) for Lincoln
Mayors of Lincoln, England